El Carnero is the colloquial name of a Spanish language colonial chronicle whose title was Conquista i descubrimiento del nuevo reino de Granada de las Indias Occidentales del mar oceano, i fundacion de la ciudad de Santa Fe de Bogotá, ... [also known as El Carnero de Bogotá] (English: Conquest and discovery of the New Kingdom of Granada of the West Indies sea, and foundation of the city of Holy Faith of Bogota). It is a chronicle of history and customs written in 1636-1638 (but not published until 1859) by Bogota-born Juan Rodríguez Freyle.

Contents 
El Carnero tells the story of the Spanish conquest of the Muisca; the early exploration of northern South America and the establishment of the New Kingdom of Granada, currently Colombia and parts of Venezuela, and the foundation and first century of the city of Bogotá. Bogotá was the first city of the kingdom to have an established royal audience and a chancellery. It also describes the indigenous peoples that inhabited the region during the conquest, the civil wars between them, and their customs and culture. It details the origin of the myth of El Dorado, the "Lost City of Gold", depicted in the Muisca raft; the initiation ritual of the zipa of the Muisca Confederation.

The chronicle is intended to be historical, but includes also several fictional elements through short stories. It is generally stated that these short stories are of great importance in the Hispano-American literature movement. El Carnero is regarded as the most important source for the historical events in the early colonial times of what later would become Colombia; the Spanish conquest of the Muisca and other Colombian conquests. Researcher Carlos Rey Pereira published his PhD in 2000 about the work, where he assessed the validity of the events described as a mixture of common opinions and rumours. Rodríguez Freyle filled the gaps between two other early Spanish chroniclers: Pedro Simón and Juan de Castellanos. Other critical reviews of the book mention the viewpoint of the writer; child of an encomendero and conquistador.

See also 

List of conquistadors in Colombia
Spanish conquest of the Muisca
Indigenous peoples in Colombia
Colombian literature, history of Colombia, history of Bogotá

Notes

References

El Carnero

Bibliography

Other works about the conquests

External links 
  El Carnero manuscript (digitized)

Novels published posthumously
1638 novels
1859 novels
Colombian novels
17th-century books
Novels set in Colombia
History of the Muisca
History of Colombia